This is a list of Jewish biblical figures.

Hebrew Bible   
 Aaron, brother of Moses and Miriam, and the first High Priest
 Abigail, a prophetess who became a wife of King David
 Abishai, one of King David's generals and relative
 Abner, cousin of King Saul and commander of his army, assassinated by Yoav
 Abraham, Isaac and Jacob, Judaism's "Three Patriarchs"
 Absalom, rebellious son of King David
 Amram and Jochebed, both Levites, parents of Moses, Aaron, and Miriam
 Bathsheba, queen, wife of King David, and mother of King Solomon
 Boaz, husband of Ruth and ancestor of King David
 Daniel
 Ezra, Nehemiah and Zerubbabel, prophets and leaders of the Babylonian captivity and Return to Zion
 Elijah and Elisha, important prophets who rebuked the kings of Israel
 Elkanah and Hannah, parents of the judge and prophet Samuel
 Esther and Mordechai, Persian queen, and her cousin, saviors of the Jews on Purim
 Gedaliah, last governor of Judea appointed by Babylonians, (assassinated)
 Gershom and Eliezer, Moses and Zipporah's sons
 Hananiah, Mishael, and Azariah (fellow exiles with and friends of Daniel) were thrown into a furnace by Nebuchadnezzar, yet survived "without the smell of smoke"
 Hosea, Joel, Amos, Obadiah, Jonah, Micah, Nahum, Habakkuk, Zephaniah, Haggai, Zechariah, Malachi, the Twelve Minor Prophets
 Isaiah, Jeremiah, Ezekiel, the Major Prophets
 Jeroboam, Nadab, Baasha, Elah, Zimri, Omri, Ahab, Ahaziah, Jehoram, Jehu, Jehoahaz, Jehoash, Jeroboam II, Zachariah, Shallum, Menahem, Pekahiah, Pekah, Hoshea, the kings of the northern Kingdom of Israel
 Jethro, a priest of Midian, Zipporah's father, and father-in-law of Moses, became a convert after Mt. Sinai
 Jonah, prophet during Kingdom of Israel
 Jonathan, son of King Saul and slain with him in battle, trusted friend of David
 Joshua, Othniel, Ehud, Shamgar, Deborah, Barak, Gideon, Abimelech, Tola, Jair, Jephthah, Ibzan, Elon, Abdon, Samson, and Eli, Samuel, the Judges who ruled after Moses and before the kings
 Saul, David, and Solomon, the kings who ruled the United Kingdom of Israel and Judah
 Leah, wife of Jacob
 Melchizedek King of Salem at the time of Abraham
 Miriam, prophetess, sister of Moses and Aaron
 Moses, adopted by Pharaoh's daughter in Egypt, leader of the Exodus from Egypt received the Torah or Law of Moses.
 Nathan, prophet in time of King David
 Neriah a prophet, and his son Baruch the scribe of Jeremiah
 Reuben, Simeon, Levi, Judah, Issachar, Zebulun, Gad, Asher,  Dan, Naphtali, Joseph, Benjamin, the Twelve Tribes the Children of Israel, sons of Jacob called Israel. (Ephraim and Manasseh, Joseph's sons were also counted as part of the twelve tribes at times.)
 Rachel, wife of Jacob
 Rebekah, wife of Isaac and mother of Esau and Jacob
 Rehoboam, Abijam, Asa, Jehoshaphat, Jehoram, Ahaziah, (Queen) Athaliah, Jehoash, Amaziah, Uzziah, Jotham, Ahaz, Hezekiah, Manasseh, Amon, Josiah, Jehoahaz, Jehoiakim, Jeconiah, Zedekiah, the kings of the southern Kingdom of Judah
 Ruth, Moabite convert and ancestor of King David
 Samuel, last of the Judges and first of the Prophets
 Sarah, Rebekah, Rachel, and Leah, Judaism's Four Matriarchs
 Tamar, daughter-in-law, and then levirate wife, of Judah
 Tamar, daughter of David, raped by Amnon
 Yoav, relative of King David, impulsive military leader
 Zilpah and Bilhah, additional wives of Jacob, mothers of four of the twelve Tribes
 Zipporah, Moses' wife, daughter of Jethro, a convert

See also
 List of burial places of biblical figures
 List of Jews

 
Biblical figures, Jewish
Biblical figures, Jewish